Aechmea alba is a species of plant in the genus Aechmea. This species is endemic to Brazil.

References

alba
Flora of Brazil
Plants described in 1892